The 1993 African Cup of Champions Clubs Final was a football tie held over two legs in December 1993 between Asante Kotoko, and Zamalek.

Zamalek from Egypt won that final 7 – 6 in the penalty shoot-out, with the aggregate ending 0 – 0, to retain Ahmed Sékou Touré trophy, as the third team to win the tournament for three times after Hafia Football Club & Canon Yaoundé.

Match details

First leg

Second leg

Notes and references
 http://www.angelfire.com/ak/EgyptianSports/ZamalekAfr1993.html
 

African Cup of Champions Clubs Finals
1
CCL
CCL
CAF Champions League Final 1993